Zee Ntuli (born 1986) is a South African filmmaker.

Ntuli's directorial debut was Bomlambo (Those Of The Water) (2013), shown at the Clermont-Ferrand International Short Film Festival. Hard To Get (2014) was a romantic thriller, "a story about falling in love and how scary it can be to trust a stranger". The film opened the 2014 Durban International Film Festival, and was shown at the BFI London Film Festival.

References

External links
 Zee Ntuli: Writer Director
 Swiss Films: Zee Ntuli
 

1986 births
Living people
South African film directors
South African television directors